The Tigress is a 1927 American silent drama film directed by George B. Seitz. The film is currently believed to be lost film.

Cast
 Jack Holt as Winston Graham, Earl of Eddington
 Dorothy Revier as Mona, 'The Tigress'
 Frank Leigh as Pietro the Bold
 Philippe De Lacy as Pippa
 Howard Truesdale as Tser (as Howard Truesdell)
 Frank Nelson as Wibble

References

External links

1927 films
1927 drama films
American silent feature films
Films directed by George B. Seitz
American black-and-white films
Columbia Pictures films
Silent American drama films
Lost American films
1927 lost films
Lost drama films
1920s American films